The Saint Lucia national football team represents Saint Lucia in men's international football and is administered by the Saint Lucia Football Association, the governing body for football in Saint Lucia. They have been a member of FIFA since 1988 and a member of CONCACAF since 1986.

History
The team attempted to qualify to the World Cup finals tournament for the first time during the 1994 World Cup qualification, when they were eliminated in the first qualification round by Saint Vincent and the Grenadines in 1992.

In the CONCACAF 2014 FIFA World Cup qualification Saint Lucia played Aruba in the first qualifying round – losing the first leg 4–2 in Aruba. The return leg in Saint Lucia ended in a 4–2 victory after 90 minutes, sending the tie into extra time, and then to penalty kicks.  Saint Lucia won the shoot-out 5–4 and advanced to the main draw for the 2014 FIFA World Cup.  Saint Lucia were then grouped with Canada, Saint Kitts and Nevis, and Puerto Rico in Group D of the second qualifying round. Saint Lucia were eliminated from World Cup qualification after finishing last in their group with one point as a result of one draw and five losses. 
In 2014 the team won the Windward Islands Tournament after beating Dominica 2–0,Grenada 1–0 and a tie with Saint Vincent & The Grenadines.

The Saint Lucia FA established a partnership with England's Carlisle United which saw four Saint Lucians trial at the club each year from 2012 in exchange for Carlisle getting right of first refusal for the players' professional rights.

FIFA announced that Saint Lucia withdrew from the 2022 FIFA World Cup qualification before their first match, after they were initially drawn into Group E in the first round.

Results and fixtures

The following is a list of match results in the last 12 months, as well as any future matches that have been scheduled.

2022

2023

Coaching history

  Kingsley Armstrong (1996)
  Cassim Louis (1999–00)
  Kingsley Armstrong (2002–04)
  Carson Millar (2004–06)
  Terrence Caroo (2006–10)
  Alain Providence (2010–11)
  Francis Lastic (2012–2018)
  Francis McDonald (2018–2019)
  Jamaal Shabazz (2019–2021)
  Stern John (2022–present)

Players

Current squad
 The following players were called up for the friendly matches.
 Match dates: 17 and 20 November 2022
 Opposition: 
 Caps and goals correct as of:' 12 June 2022, after the match against 

Recent call-ups

Player recordsPlayers in bold are still active with Saint Lucia.''

Competitive record

FIFA World Cup

CONCACAF Gold Cup

CONCACAF Nations League

Caribbean Cup

References

External links
  of the Football Federation of St Lucia
 Team profile on CONCACAF.com

 
Caribbean national association football teams
1994 establishments in Saint Lucia